Ganderkesee (Northern Low Saxon: Gannerseer) is a municipality in Oldenburg district, in Lower Saxony, Germany.

Geography
Ganderkesee is located on the northern edge of a nature park called "Wildeshauser Geest". The northernmost part of the community is in the glacial valley of the Weser. The sandy, higher and hilly terrain of Geest joins south.

The municipality Ganderkesee bordered to the east by the city of Delmenhorst, in the north of the communities Lemwerder and Berne in the district Wesermarsch and to the municipality Hude, to the west of the town Hatten and on the south by the municipalities Dötlingen and Harpstedt.

Divisions
Ganderkesee includes 25 hamlets with about 31,200 residents: Ganderkesee, Almsloh, Bergedorf, Bookholzberg, Bookhorn, Bürstel, Elmeloh, Falkenburg, Grüppenbühren, Habbrügge, Havekost, Heide, Hengsterholz, Hohenböken, Holzkamp, Hoyerswege, Hoykenkamp, Immer, Neuenlande, Rethorn, Schierbrok, Schlutter, Schönemoor, Steinkimmen and Stenum.

History
Ganderkesee was mentioned in 860 AD for the first time under the name of "Gandrikesarde".

Twin towns – sister cities

Ganderkesee is twinned with:
 Montval-sur-Loir, France
 Pułtusk, Poland

Transport
With "Atlas Airport", Ganderkesee possesses a regional airport.

Council
Mayor: Ralf Wessel (CDU), elected in September 2021.

The Council of Ganderkesee:
 SPD: 12 seats
 CDU: 11 seats
 FDP: 3 seats
 UWG (Independent voters Community Ganderkesee) / Free votes: 3 seats
 Bündnis 90/Die Grünen: 6 seats

Trivia
Near Steinkimmen is a  guyed steel tube mast for FM- and TV-broadcasting, the Transmitter Steinkimmen.

References

External links
Official website
Atlas Airfield website
Transmitter Steinkimmen (German)

Oldenburg (district)